Bahia (meaning "bay") is one of the 26 states of Brazil, located in the Northeast Region of the country. It is the fourth-largest Brazilian state by population (after São Paulo, Minas Gerais, and Rio de Janeiro) and the 5th-largest by area. Bahia's capital is the city of Salvador (formerly known as "Cidade do São Salvador da Bahia de Todos os Santos", literally "City of the Saint Savior of the Bay of All the Saints"), on a spit of land separating the Bay of All Saints from the Atlantic. Once a monarchial stronghold dominated by agricultural, slaving, and ranching interests, Bahia is now a predominantly working-class industrial and agricultural state. The state is home to 7% of the Brazilian population and produces 4.2% of the country's GDP.

Name
The name of the state derives from the earlier captaincy of Bahia de Todos os Santos, named for Bay of All Saints ( in modern Portuguese), a major feature of its coastline. The bay itself was named by the explorer Amerigo Vespucci during his second voyage, when he found it on All Saints' Day (1 November), 1502. He named it after his parish church in Florence, San Salvatore di Ognissanti ("Holy Savior of All the Saints"). Over time, the bay became distinguished as the Bay of All Saints, the state as Bahia ("Bay"), and its capital first as Bahia and then finally as Salvador.

Geography 

Bahia is bordered on the east by the Atlantic Ocean. The Bay of All Saints is the largest bay on the Brazilian coast. Under the Brazilian Empire, it was bounded on the north by the Rio Real and by the Jequitinhonha on the south, but Bahia now comprises an irregular shape bound by other states of Brazil, some of which were formed from it. In the north, it is now bordered (from east to west) by Sergipe, Alagoas, Pernambuco and Piauí. In the northwest, it is bordered by Tocantins. In the southwest, it borders Goiás, and in the south it is bordered (from east to west) by Espírito Santo and Minas Gerais.

The state is crossed from west to east by many rivers, but the most important is the São Francisco, which starts in Minas Gerais and runs through western Bahia before emptying into the Atlantic between Sergipe and Alagoas. Formerly plied by paddlewheel steamers, the river is only navigable to small modern craft but is still vital to the arid west since it continuously supplies water during seasons when many other smaller rivers dry out. The Sobradinho Dam created one of the largest reservoirs in the world; other major hydroelectric projects along its length include the Paulo Afonso Hydroelectric Complex and the Itaparica or Luiz Gonzaga Dam.

Regions

The state is crossed from north to south by the Diamantina Tableland, which divides it into two distinct geographical zones. To the east, the soil is fertile and the rain falls regularly. The natural aridity was greatly worsened over the 19th century by the cowboys' habit of starting wildfires each year to improve the quality of the grass. The Chapada Diamantina National Park is home to picturesque .

Coconut Coast

The Green Road, a road that connects Mangue Seco in the far north to Praia do Forte, crosses this region maintaining a critical distance from the areas of environmental preservation. At Praia do Forte, the road meets the Coconut Road (Estrada do Côco) leading to Salvador, passing through spots, which are now integrated in the urban development of the state capital. In this region is located Deputado Luís Eduardo Magalhães International Airport.

Bay of All Saints

The largest bay on the Brazilian coast, the Bay of All Saints has a large number of islands with tropical beaches and vegetation. In its 1,052 square km, it contains 56 islands, receives fresh water from numerous rivers and creeks (especially the Paraguaçú and Subaé) and bathes the first capital of Brazil and the largest in the Northeast, Salvador, and more than ten municipalities. The bay offers various leisure options, with hundreds of vessels of all different types, especially saveiros, schooners, motor boats, jet ski that criss-cross its crystalline waters on maritime excursions to the islands, and boat races. Events and sport activities occur throughout the year, beginning on 1 January, with the Procession of Bom Jesus dos Navegantes greeting the New Year.

All Saints' has also been traditionally the venue for rowing contests at the Enseada dos Tainheiros, in Salvador and now the bay is included in the routes of the great international regattas, such as the Ralley Les Iles du Soleil, regatta Hong Kong Challenge and the Expo 98 Round the World Rally, which consider the bay an important stop along the route. The islands of the bay are a separate attraction. Some are privately owned, others were declared a state heritage and transformed into Environmental Protection Areas or ecological stations. Other islands are the patrimony of 12 municipalities located around the bay. Only a few are uninhabited and many have small communities where the natives live on fishing and tourism. All have common characteristics, such a calm sea, dense vegetation, especially coconuts and bananas, as well as vestiges of the Atlantic Forest. Of the 56 islands, the most important are Itaparica, Madre de Deus, Maré, Frades, Medo, Bom Jesus dos Passos.

Dendê Coast

The Dendê Coast, south of Salvador, is surrounded by verdant vegetation, clear waters, islands, bays, coral reefs and a very diversified fauna. The name of the area refers to the cultivation of the palm oil, or Elaeis guineensis, likely imported from West Africa. It is connected to Salvador and the southern part of the state by ferryboats and the BA-001 highway, the second ecological highway along the Bahian coast, which connects the southern coastline and the extreme southern part of the state. It includes the municipalities of Valença, Cairu and the International attractions of Morro de São Paulo, Camamu, Taperoá, Igrapiúna, Ituberá and Maraú. The mouth of the Rio Una, in the form of a delta, contains 26 islands, the largest of which is Ilha de Tinharé, where the Morro de São Paulo is located. At Boipeba and Cairú, which are part of the archipelago of Tinharé, the diversity of the ecosystems enables visitors to practice water sports, walk along the beach, follow trails in the rainforest and bathe on completely deserted beaches such as Garapuá.

Cacao Coast
Along the southern coast of Bahia, the Cacao Coast preserves ecological sanctuaries with dozens of kilometers of beaches shaded by dense coconut groves, the Atlantic Forest, large areas of wetland vegetation and cacao plantations. Walking along paths in the forest or along the beaches, horseback riding along the coast, boat trips up the vast number of rivers are some of the options that the region offers. Here one can find Environmental Protection Areas at Itacaré/Serra Grande and the Lagoa Encantada in Ilhéus, the Biological Reserve of Una and the Ecological Reserve of Prainha at Itacaré. Highway BA-001 links the municipalities, nearly always bordering the coastline. The most important locations at Cacao Coast are: Itacaré, Ilhéus, and Olivença.

Discovery Coast

The Discovery Coast preserves, virtually intact, the landscape seen by the Portuguese fleet described in the first pages of the history of Brazil. There are various types of water sports, walks, trips on horseback, surfing and deep sea diving trips available. Recife de Fora, Coroa Alta and Trancoso can be reached in one day schooner excursions. BA-001 and two ferryboat systems over the Rio João de Tiba and Rio Buranhém connect the municipalities with the coast. Trips from Barra do Cai, passing through the Parque Nacional do Monte Pascoal, Caraíva, Trancoso, Arraial d'Ajuda, the environmental protection areas of Santo Antônio and Coroa Vermelha, to the mouth of the Rio João de Tiba as far as the Rio Jequitinhonha are among the various ecological trips available.

Diamantina Tableland

The geographical center of Bahia is the Diamantina Tableland region. It is a mountainous region with diversified topography. 90% of the rivers of the Paraguaçu, Jacuípe, and Rio das Contas basins have their source here. There are thousands of kilometers of clear waters that spring from these mountains and descend in cascades and waterfalls to plateaus and plains, forming natural pools. The vegetation mixes cactus species of the caatinga dry lands with rare examples of the mountain flora, especially bromeliads, orchids and "sempre vivas" (member of the strawflower family).

Another scenic attraction is the Cachoeira da Fumaça ("Waterfall"), which falls ; the Gruta dos Brejões, the largest cavern opening of Bahia; and the Poço Encantado. Many of the sites are protected by the National Park of the Diamantina Tableland and the Environmental Preservation Area Serra do Barbado and Marimbus, Iraquara.

Climate

Bahia's climate is tropical. It has the longest coastline of the country: 1,103 km long (685 miles; north coast: 143; Bay of All Saints: 124; and southern: 418).

History 

The Portuguese Pedro Álvares Cabral sighted Monte Pascoal ("Easter Mountain") near Itamaraju and landed at what is now Porto Seguro on the southern coast of Bahia in 1500, claiming the territory for Portugal. In 1549, Portugal established the city of Salvador on a hill facing the Bay of All Saints. The city and surrounding captaincy served as an administrative capital of Portugal's colonies in the Americas until 1763. It remained the religious capital of Brazil's Roman Catholic hierarchy, with its archbishop serving as the national primate until 1907. Salvador holds the country's oldest cathedral and first medical college (1810), and an engineering school was established in 1899.

Bahia's captaincy was the first to fail, with its lands reverting to the Portuguese crown in 1549. While Portugal was united with Spain, the Dutch  West India companies tried to conquer Bahia but was unsuccessful in the area, with Dutch Brazil restricted to the area from Pernambuco Northward.

Bahia was a center of sugarcane cultivation from the 16th to the 18th centuries and contains a number of historic towns, such as Cachoeira, dating from this era. Integral to the sugar economy was the importation of a vast number of African slaves: more than a third of all slaves taken from Africa were sent to Brazil, mostly to be processed in Bahia before being sent to work in plantations elsewhere in the country.

The state was the last area of the country to join the Empire of Brazil, as members in the local elite remained loyal to the Portuguese crown after the rest of the country proclaimed independence under  on 7 September 1822. Control of the province was disputed in several battles, mostly in Pirajá, before the Portuguese were fully expelled on 2 July 1823. It became a Brazilian state in 1889.

Charles Darwin visited Bahia in 1832 on his famous voyage on the Beagle. In 1835, Bahia was the site of an urban slave revolt, the Malê Revolt of 1835 by the predominantly Muslim West African slaves at the time. The term malê was commonly used to refer to Muslims at the time from the Yoruba word imale. The revolt is particularly notable as the greatest slave rebellion in the history of the Bahia.  Under the Empire, Bahia returned 14 deputies to the general assembly and 7 senators; its own provincial assembly consisted of 36 members. In the 19th century, cotton, coffee, and tobacco plantations joined those for sugarcane and the discovery of diamonds in 1844 led to large influx of "washers" until the still-larger deposits in South Africa came to light. A smaller boom hit Caetité in 1872 upon the discovery of amethysts there. The cattle industry of the interior led to the development of Feira de Santana before collapsing in a series of droughts.

Politics
After the end of military governments in Brazil in 1985, the state of Bahia was usually governed by PFL or PMDB. The Workers' Party achieved the governorship in 2007 and has held it ever since, in five successive elections (2006, 2010, 2014, 2018, and 2022).

Demographics

According to IBGE data of 2008, there were 14,561,000 people residing in the state. Urban population: 67.4% (2006); Population growth: 1.1% (1991–2000); Houses: 3,826,000 (2006). The last PNAD (National Census of a Sample of Households) showed the following numbers:  9,149,000 Brown (Multiracial) people (62.83%), 3,000,000 White people (20.60%), 2,328,000 Black people (15.99%), 42,000 Amerindian people (0.29%), 37,000 Asian people (0.26%).

According to Instituto Socioambiental, there are 14 Indigenous groups in the state: Atikum, Kaimbé, Kantaruré, Kiriri, Pankaru, Pankararé, Pataxó, Pataxó Hã-ha-
hãe, Payayá, Truká, Tumbalalá, Tupinambá, Tuxá and Xukuru-Kariri.

Historically, the population was estimated at 1.45 million in the 1870s and was 1.92 million at the time of the 1890 Brazilian census.

Public Safety
Bahia has one of the highest crime rates in the country, having four of the ten most violent cities in Brazil. Gun violence in the state more than doubled from 2004 to 2014, ranking first out of the 26 states of Brazil. In 2014, the state also had the highest number of murders in the country.

Largest cities

Education

Educational institutions
 Centro Universitário da Bahia (FIB) (University Centre of Bahia);
 Escola Bahiana de Medicina e Saúde Pública (EBMSP) (Bahian School of Medicine and Public Health);
 Federal do Vale do São Francisco (UNIVASF) (Foundation Federal University of São Francisco Valley);
 Instituto Federal da Bahia (IFBA);
 Instituto Federal Baiano (IFBAIANO);
 Universidade Católica de Salvador (UCSal) (Catholic University of Salvador);
 Universidade do Estado da Bahia (UNEB) (Bahia State University);
 Universidade Estadual de Feira de Santana (UEFS) (State University of Feira de Santana);
 Universidade Estadual de Santa Cruz (UESC) (State University of Santa Cruz);
 Universidade Estadual do Sudoeste da Bahia (Uesb) (State University of Southwest of Bahia);
 Universidade Federal da Bahia (UFBA) (Federal University of Bahia);
 Universidade Federal do Recôncavo da Bahia (UFRB) (Federal University of Recôncavo da Bahia);
 Universidade Salvador (Unifacs) (Salvador University);
 and many others.

Culture

As the chief locus of the early Brazilian slave trade, Bahia is considered to possess the greatest and most distinctive African imprint, in terms of culture and customs, in Brazil. These include the Yoruba-derived religious system of Candomblé, the capoeira (martial art emerged in Quilombo dos Palmares, located in the state of Alagoas ), African-derived music such as samba (especially Brazlian samba precursor, the samba-de-roda), afoxé, and axé, and a cuisine with strong links to western Africa.

Bahia is the birthplace of many noted Brazilian artists, writers and musicians. Among the noted musical figures born in the state are Waldick Soriano, Raul Seixas, Marcelo Nova, Luiz Caldas, Dinho, Netinho, Dorival Caymmi, Joao Gilberto, Bira, and Carlinhos Brown.

The city of Salvador is also home to groups known as "blocos-afros", including Olodum, Ara Ketu,  and Ilê Aiyê. Additionally, groups such as Chiclete com Banana, Camisa de Vênus, A Cor do Som, Novos Baianos are based in Bahia. The first well-known rock'n roll singer in Brazil was also from Bahia. Born Raul Seixas, he was known as "Maluco Beleza" or "Peaceful Lunatic" (being "beleza (beauty)" in this manner means to be either "in peace" or "tranquil").

During the 19th century, one of Brazil's greatest poets, the Bahian abolitionist poet and playwright Castro Alves, a native of the recôncavo city of Cachoeira, penned his poem, Navio negreiro, about slavery; the poem is considered a masterpiece of Brazilian Romanticism and a central anti-slavery text.

Other notable Bahian writers include playwright and screenwriter Dias Gomes, Gregório de Matos, who wrote during the 17th century and was one of the first Brazilian writers, and Fr. António Vieira, who during the colonial period was one of many authors who contributed to the expansion of the Portuguese language throughout the Brazilian territory.

One of Brazil's most prominent writers of the 20th century, Jorge Amado, was born in the southeastern Bahian city of Itabuna, and resided for many years in Salvador. His major novels include Gabriela, Clove and Cinnamon; Dona Flor and Her Two Husbands; and Tieta, the Goat Girl, all of which became internationally renowned films. Other notable authors from Bahia include the fiction writers João Ubaldo Ribeiro and historic writer Euclides da Cunha, who wrote "Os Sertões".
In the visual and plastic arts, one of the best known Bahian figures was the multigenre artist and Argentinian native Hector Julio Páride Bernabó, also known as Carybé (1911–1997). Fine examples of his work are visible in the Afro-Brazilian Museum in Salvador.

In the interior of the state, there is the traditional culture of the vaqueiros among agricultural communities. From the 1550s onward, in Bahia, these farmers were integral to the process of expansion away from the coasts of Brazil.

Tourism and recreation

Salvador has a Historical Center registered by UNESCO as a World Heritage Site. In the last few years, the State Government promoted the total restoration of the Pelourinho, the largest group of colonial Iberian baroque style buildings in Latin America, today transformed into an important point for visitation by tourists. Pelourinho was once Salvador's principal red-light district as well as a working-class neighborhood that was home to thousands of Afro-Brazilians. Since 1992, however, the overwhelming majority of these people have been forcibly removed and replaced by boutiques, NGO headquarters, government offices, folkloric representations, monuments, and amenities for tourists.

Economy 

In 2004, Bahia comprised 4.9% of the economic activity of Brazil and it has the biggest GDP of the states of the North and Northeast. The industrial sector is the largest component of GDP at 48.5%, followed by the service sector at 40.8%. Agriculture represents 10.7% of GDP (2004). Bahia exports: chemicals 22.4%, fuel 17.5%, mineral metallics 13%, paper 9.4%, cacao 5.6%, vehicles 4.8%, soybean 4.5% (2002). In addition to important agricultural and industrial sectors, the state also has considerable mineral and petroleum deposits. In recent years, soy cultivation has increased substantially in the state. Bahia is the sixth largest economy in the country.

During the colonial and imperial periods, Bahia was a center of Brazilian sugarcane production and slave trading. In the 19th century, the Bay of All Saints was also a whaling spot, as some species of whales used the bay as a mating ground. By that time, the province was also growing cotton, coffee, and tobacco with great success. mandioc, rice, beans, and corn, saffron, oranges, mangoes, and other fruit were grown for local consumption. The arid interior was mostly used for cattle-farming, but this was ruined by a series of droughts caused in part by the custom of starting annual wildfires to improve the grass. Diamonds, gold, and amethysts were panned for in the rivers, while coal was mined on Itaparica. cacao was being farmed by the time of the First World War. As late as the mid-1950s, the Bahian economy could be considered a typical example of the primary-exporting model, which followed the subsistence production. For ten years, this dynamic was led by the cocoa crop, that used to be the state's main product and its most important source of income. With the acceleration of the industrialisation process in the 1970s, which started in the 1950s, the productive structure began to change. This process, which was not limited to the regional market, was inserted in the Brazilian industry matrix through the chemical (specially petrochemical) and metallurgical segment. Consequently, for the last twenty years, it grew more than the national average, due to the fact that the state was previously below the average level. The industrial sector is the main contributor to this growth, when the investments that was being made was in the chemical, petrochemical and automotive segment, and in agroindustry and food production.

In agriculture, the state stands out in the production of cotton, cocoa, soy and tropical fruits such as coconut, papaya, mango, banana and guarana, in addition to also producing sugar cane, orange, beans and cassava, among others.

In 2017, the Northeast Region was the largest producer of coconut in the country, with 74.0% of national production. Bahia produced 351 million fruits, being the leader in the country. However, the sector has been suffering strong competition and losing market to Indonesia, the Philippines and India, the world's largest producers, who even export coconut water to Brazil. In addition to climatic problems, the low productivity of coconut palms in the Northeast Region is the result of factors related to the variety of coconut harvested and the technological level used in coastal regions. In these areas, the semi-extractive cultivation system still prevails, with low fertility and without the adoption of cultural management practices. The three states that have the largest production, Bahia, Sergipe and Ceará, present a yield three times lower than that of Pernambuco, which is in 5th place in the national production. This is because most of the coconut trees in these three states are located in coastal areas and cultivated in semi-extractivist systems.

In the production of cocoa, for a long time, Bahia led the Brazilian production. Today, it is disputing the leadership of national production with the state of Pará. In 2017 Pará obtained the leadership for the first time. In 2019, people from Pará harvested 135 thousand tons of cocoa, and Bahians harvested 130 thousand tons. Bahia's cocoa area is practically three times larger than that of Pará, but Pará's productivity is practically three times greater. Some factors that explain this are: the crops in Bahia are more extractivist, and those in Pará have a more modern and commercial style, in addition to paraenses using more productive and resistant seeds, and their region providing resistance to Witch's broom.

In 2018, the Northeast was in 3rd place among the regions that most produce sugar cane in the country. Brazil is the world's largest producer, with 672.8 million tons harvested this year. The Northeast harvested 45.7 million tons, 6.8% of national production. Alagoas is the largest producer, with 33.3% of Northeastern production (15.2 million tons). Pernambuco is the 2nd largest producer in the Northeast, with 22.7% of the total in the region (10.3 million tons). Paraíba has 11.9% of northeastern production (5.5 million tons) and Bahia, 10.24% of production (4.7 million tons).

Bahia is the 2nd largest producer of cotton in Brazil, losing only to Mato Grosso. In 2019, it harvested 1.5 million tonnes of the product.

In soy, Brazil produced close to 120 million tons in 2019, being the largest world producer. In 2019, the Northeast produced close to 10.7 million tons, or 9% of the Brazilian total. The largest producer in the Northeast was Bahia (5.3 million tons).

In the production of maize, in 2018 Brazil was the 3rd largest producer in the world, with 82 million tons. The Northeast produced about 8.4% of the country's total. Bahia was the largest producer in the Northeast, with 2.2 million tons.

In 2018, the South Region was the main producer of beans with 26.4% of the total, followed by the Midwest (25.4%), Southeast Region (25.1%), Northeast (20.6%) and North (2.5%). The largest producers in the Northeast were Ceará and Bahia.

In cassava production, Brazil produced a total of 17.6 million tons in 2018. Maranhão was the 7th largest producer in the country, with 681 thousand tons. Ceará was 9th, with 622 thousand tons. Bahia was 10th with 610 thousand tons. In total, the northeast produced 3,5 million tons.

Bahia was the 4th largest producer of oranges in Brazil in 2018, with a total of 604 thousand tons, 3,6% of the national production.

Bahia is the second largest fruit producer in the country, with more than 3.3 million tons a year, behind São Paulo. The north of Bahia is one of the main fruit suppliers in the country. The State is one of the main national producers of ten types of fruit. In 2017, Bahia led the production of cajarana, coconut, count fruit or pinecone, soursop, umbu, jackfruit, licuri, mango and passion fruit, and is in second place in cocoa almond, atemoia, cupuaçu, lime and lemon, and third in banana, carambola, guava, papaya, watermelon, melon, cherry, pomegranate and table grapes. In all, 34 products from Bahia's fruit culture have an important participation in the national economy.

Rio Grande do Norte is the largest producer of melon in the country. In 2017 it produced 354 thousand tons. The Northeast region accounted for 95.8% of the country's production in 2007. In addition to Rio Grande do Norte, which in 2005 produced 45.4% of the country's total, the other 3 largest in the country were Ceará, Bahia and Pernambuco.

In the production of papaya, in 2018 Bahia was the 2nd largest producer state in Brazil, almost equaling with Espírito Santo: 337 thousand tons.

Bahia was the largest producer of mango in the country in 2019, with production of around 281 thousand tons per year. Juazeiro (130 thousand tons per year) and Casa Nova (54 thousand tons per year) are at the top of the list of Brazilian cities that lead the cultivation of fruit.

In the production of banana, in 2018 Bahia was the 2nd largest national producer.

Bahia is the largest Brazilian producer of guaraná. In 2017, Brazilian production was close to 3.3 million tons. Bahia harvested 2.3 million (mainly in the city of Taperoá), Amazonas 0.7 million (mainly in the city of Maués) and the rest of the country, 0.3 million. Despite the fact that the fruit originated in the Amazon, since 1989 Bahia has beaten Amazonas in terms of production volume and guarana productivity, due to the fact that the soil in Bahia is more favorable, in addition to the absence of diseases in the region. The most famous users of the product, however, acquire 90% to 100% of their guarana from the Amazon region, such as Ambev and Coca-Cola. Bahian guarana prices are well below those of other states, but Sudam's tax exemptions lead the beverage industry to prefer to purchase seeds in the North, which helps maintain the highest added value of Amazonian guarana. The pharmaceutical industries and importers, on the other hand, buy more guarana from Bahia, due to the price.

The Northeast region housed 93.2% of the Brazilian goat herd (8,944,461 heads) and 64.2% of the sheep herd (11,544,939 heads) in 2017. Bahia concentrated 30.9% of the goat herd and 20.9% of the national sheep herd. Casa Nova took first place in the municipal ranking with the largest numbers of both species.

In 2017, Bahia had 1.68% of the national mineral participation (4th place in the country). Bahia had production of gold (6.2 tons at a value of R$730 million), copper (56 thousand tons, at a value of R$404 million); chrome (520 thousand tons, at a value of R$254 million) and vanadium (358 thousand tons, at a value of R$91 million).

Bahia had an industrial GDP of R$53.0 billion in 2017, equivalent to 4.4% of the national industry. It employs 356,997 workers in the industry. The main industrial sectors are: Construction (24.8%), Industrial Services of Public Utility, such as Electricity and Water (15.0%),  Petroleum Derivatives and Biofuels (13.8%), Chemicals (9.4%), and Food (6.1%). These 5 sectors concentrate 69.1% of the state's industry.

Bahian industry have automobile and tyre industries, footwear and textiles, furniture, food and beverages, cosmetics and perfumes, information technology and naval sectors.

In Brazil, the automotive sector represents close to 22% of industrial GDP. Bahia has a Ford factory. It was created in Camaçari (2001). The Bahian automotive sector, led by Ford was in 2005 the third largest contributor (14.6%) to the Bahian GDP.

Chemical and petrochemical
Bahia's Petrochemical Pole is the largest integrated complex in the Southern Hemisphere, and is the result of R$10 billion in investments, accounting for a third of the state's exports and for nearly half of the industrial production value.

Reconcavo Basin
The Reconcavo Basin has been a principal petroleum-producing region, mainly from the Upper Jurassic and Lower Cretaceous Bahia Supergroup, since 1939 and contains the Agua Grande Field (discovered in 1951 by the Conselho Nacional de Petroleo and producing from the Sergei and Candeias Formations at about 1 km depth and the shallower Ilhas Formation), the Dom Joao Field (discovered in 1947 by the Conselho Nacional de Petroleo and producing from the Sergei Formation at a depth of about 200 m), the Miranga Field (discovered in 1965 by Petrobras producing from the Ilhas Formation at a depth of about 1 km), the Candeias Field (discovered in 1941 by Conselho Nacional de Petroleo and producing from the Candeias Formation at a depth ranging from 690 to 2400 m), the Buracica Field (discovered in 1959 by Petrobras and producing from the Sergi Formation at about 600 m depth), and the Taquipe Field (discovered in 1958 by Petrobras and producing from the Ilhas Formation).

Other market segments
Agribusiness;
Footwear;
Call Centers;
Informatics, Electronics, and Telecommunications;
Nautical;
Paper and Pulp;
Textiles;
Plastic Transformation; and
Tourism.

Public investment

The State of Bahia has been assigning a significant part of its revenues to public investments. The investment programs of the state have been backed basically by its own resources and, in a complementary fashion, with resources originating from credit operations signed with international organizations (World Bank, IDB, KFW, OECF, etc.), and with national creditors (CEF, BNDES, etc.). There are governmental investments in progress in the fields of environmental and urban sanitation (Bahia Azul), popular housing (Viver Melhor), transportation (Corredores Rodoviários), tourism (Prodetur), urban development (Produr), and regional development (Sertão Forte).

Infrastructure

Airports

In 2007, the airport handled 5,920,573 passengers and 91,043 aircraft movements, making it the fifth busiest airport in Brazil in terms of passengers. It's responsible for more than 30% of passenger movement in northeastern Brazil. Nearly 35,000 people circulate daily through the passenger terminal. The airport generates more than 16,000 direct and indirect jobs, to serve a daily average of over 10,000 passengers, 250 takeoffs and landings of 100 domestic and 16 international flights.

The international airlines are Lufthansa, TAP, United Airlines, American Airlines, Alitália, Air France, Air Europa, Ibéria, Aerolíneas Argentinas, LanChile. In addition to domestic and regional services, the airport has non-stop flights to Lisbon, Madrid, Frankfurt, Montevideo, London, Santiago, Buenos Aires, Asunción and Miami. Its IATA airport code is SSA and it is the sixth busiest airport in the country, the first in northeastern Brazil, behind Congonhas International, Guarulhos International, Juscelino Kubitschek International, Santos Dumont Regional and Galeão International.

Bahia also has some smaller modern regional airports like Ilhéus Jorge Amado Airport or Porto Seguro Airport.

Highways

The state has its transportation based on highways, with few options in other sectors. The main highways in the state are all from the Federal Government:

BR-101 – It borders the state coast, connecting it with the country's richest region (Southeast) and with the rest of the Northeast. It passes through the cocoa producing area of the state, in the cities of Itabuna and Ilhéus, reaching the capital Salvador and from there to Aracaju, capital of Sergipe.
BR-116 – also crosses the state from north to south, parallel to BR 101 but passing further inland. It cuts through some of the important cities of the state, such as Vitória da Conquista, Jequié, Feira de Santana and Euclides da Cunha, going towards the interior of Pernambuco and Fortaleza, capital of Ceará.
BR-242 – the highway cuts the state in half in an east–west direction, connecting Salvador to Brasília, the country's capital. It passes through important cities like Lençóis, Barreiras and Luís Eduardo Magalhães.
BR-407 – together with BR-324, the highway connects the region of Bahia, which is the largest producer of fruit and the largest breeder of sheep and goats, in the cities of Juazeiro and Casa Nova, to Feira de Santana, Salvador and southeastern Brazil. The BR-235 borders the North of the state, connecting these same regions to the coast of Bahia.
BR-110 – crossing the interior of the Northeast Region, this highway connects Salvador with the hydroelectric plant of Paulo Afonso and reaches Mossoró, in Rio Grande do Norte

Also noteworthy is the BR-030, which crosses the south of Bahia in an east–west direction.

Ports

With cargo volume that grows year after year following the same economic development rhythm implemented in the State, the Port of Salvador, located on the Bay of All Saints, holds status as the port with the highest movement of containers of the North/Northeast and the second-leading fruit exporter in Brazil. The port's facilities operate from 8am to noon and from 1h30am to 5h30pm.

The ability to handle high shipping volume has positioned the port of Salvador for new investments in technological modernization, and the port is noted for implementing a high level of operational flexibility and competitive rates. The goal of port officials is to offer the necessary infrastructure for the movement of goods, while simultaneously meeting the needs of international importers and exporters.

Sports

Football is the most popular sport. The two most popular football teams are Esporte Clube Bahia  and Esporte Clube Vitoria. In 2013, Bahia and Vitoria played in the Brazilian Championship Serie A (first division/premier league). Bahia has won the two most important football national league: The Taça Brasil in 1959 and the Brazilian Championship Serie A (Campeonato Brasileiro) in 1988. Vitoria has never been a national champion but was runner up of the Brazilian Serie A in 1993.

Bahia is renowned for its mixed martial arts fans, with prominent fighters from this state including former heavyweight champion of both Pride Fighting Championship and Ultimate Fighting Championship Antônio Rodrigo Nogueira, his twin brother Antônio Rogério Nogueira, and former Ultimate Fighting Championship Heavyweight Champion Junior dos Santos. In the sport of boxing, Bahian native Acelino Freitas has won the WBC belt in the lightweight class. In the Capoeira world, the actor and Capoeira Master, Lateef Crowder dos Santos is an American born in Salvador, Bahia.

Salvador was one of the host cities of the 2014 FIFA World Cup, for which Brazil was the host nation.

Flag

The flag was officially adopted on 11 June 1960. The Bahian flag is influenced by the flag of the United States, as well as colors and symbolism from the 1789 separatist movement of Inconfidência Mineira and the 1798 Bahian slave rebellion of the Revolt of the Tailors.

See also
Virtual Museum of the São João da Bahia Theater
Urânia Vanério

References

Further reading
 Collins, John F. (2015), Revolt of the Saints: Memory and Redemption in the Twilight of Brazilian Racial Democracy, Durham: Duke University Press: describes the hotly contested restoration of the Pelourinho, or Salvador, Bahia's colonial city center that is today a UNESCO World Heritage Site, and links these changes to racial politics in Brazil today.
 : covers the period from the abolition of slavery in 1888 to the start of Brazil's military regime in 1964.

External links

 ANP report on the Reconcavo Basin 
 All about Salvador Bahia Brazil 
 Bahia from Salvador to Porto Seguro
 discovering Bahia in your language 
 Population of Bahia 
 Cities in the South of Bahia 
 Indira Weis's travelogue in Bahia 
 A Most Accurate Picture of Brazil, a map of the Bahia region from 1630 

 
States of Brazil

States and territories established in 1823
1823 establishments in Brazil
Former Portuguese colonies